Tiboy Airport  is a public use airport near Tiboy, Beni, Bolivia.

See also

Transport in Bolivia
List of airports in Bolivia

References

External links 
OpenStreetMap - Tiboy

Airports in Beni Department